Herth is a surname. Notable people with the surname include:

 Antoine Herth (born 1963), French politician
 Milt Herth (1902–1989), American jazz organist

See also
 Harth